Corymborkis veratrifolia, commonly known as the white cinnamon orchid is a plant in the orchid family and is native to areas from tropical and subtropical Asia to Australia and the Pacific Islands. It is an evergreen, terrestrial orchid with a thin, upright stem, papery, pleated leaves and a short flowering stems with up to sixty crowded, short-lived green and white flowers.

Description
The leaves are dark green, thin-textured and corrugated. Flowering occurs between December and March in Australia, December to July in New Guinea and in July in China.

Taxonomy and naming
The white cinnamon orchid was first formally described in 1825 by Caspar Georg Carl Reinwardt who gave it the name Hysteria veratrifolia and published the description in Sylloge Plantarum Novarum Itemque Minus Cognitarum a Praestantissimis Botanicis adhuc Viventibus Collecta et a Societate Regia Botanica Ratisbonensi Edita. In 1859 Carl Ludwig Blume changed the name to Corymborkis veratrifolia. The specific epithet (veratrifolia) is derived from the Latin words veratrum meaning "hellebore" and folia meaning "leaves".

Distribution and habitat
Corymborkis veratrifolia grows in shady places in forest and rainforest in China, Taiwan, Cambodia, India, Indonesia, the Ryukyu Islands, Laos, Malaysia, Myanmar, Sri Lanka, Thailand, Vietnam, islands in the south west Pacific and northern Australia. In Australia it is found between the Iron Range and Airlie Beach in Queensland.

References

veratrifolia
Orchids of India
Orchids of Sri Lanka
Flora of the Andaman Islands
Orchids of Queensland
Orchids of Vietnam
Orchids of Thailand
Orchids of Indonesia
Orchids of Japan
Orchids of New Guinea
Plants described in 1825